Charles Frederick (Chuck) Hurston (November 9, 1942 – November 3, 2015) was a professional American football defensive end who played seven professional seasons from 1964-1971. He was drafted by the American Football League's Buffalo Bills in 1965.  After winning the American Football League Championship with the Chiefs in 1966, he started for them in the first AFL-NFL World Championship Game. He was also with the 1969 Chiefs who won Super Bowl IV. He died of cancer in 2015.

See also
Other American Football League players

References

1942 births
2015 deaths
American football defensive ends
Auburn Tigers football players
Kansas City Chiefs players
Buffalo Bills players
Players of American football from Columbus, Georgia
American Football League players